Nepali literature refers to literature written in the Nepali language. The Nepali language has been the national language of Nepal since 1958.

Nepali language evolved from Sanskrit and it is difficult to exactly date the history of Nepali language literature since most of the early scholars wrote in Sanskrit. It is, however, possible to roughly divide Nepali literature into five periods.

Pre-Bhanubhakta era
It is thought that Nepali literature has existed in verbal folklore for hundreds of years; however, there exists no evidence of a written literary work before the Bhanubhakta. Before Bhanubhakta, writing was done in Sanskrit, and because it was a language accessible exclusively to high-caste Brahmins at the time, common Nepali people were not involved in literature.
A few scholars have argued that poet Suwananda Daas was the first literary figure in the history of modern Nepal. A contemporary of Bhanubhakta who represented Nirgun Bhakti Dhara (attribute-less devotional stream), Saint Gyandil Das was a poet working in Nepali and composed Udayalahari.

Bhanubhakta era
Nepali speakers honor Bhanubhakta as the "Adikavi" (literally meaning 'first poet') of the Nepali language. Bhanubhakta's most important contribution to Nepali literature is his translation of the holy Ramayana into the Nepali language. He transcribed Ramayana in metric form, using the same form as Sanskrit scholars. Besides translating the Ramayana, Bhanubhakta also wrote original poems on a diverse range of subjects: from advocacy of family morals to satires of bureaucracy and the poor conditions of prisoners.

Early 20th century

This era is also known s Motiram Bhatta era, after the poet Motiram Bhatta. Motiram Bhatta (1923–1953 BS or 1866–1896 CE) revived the legacy of Bhanubhakta and publicized the contributions of the latter. Motiram played such a fundamental role in the legacy of Bhanubhakta that some allege that Bhanubhakta was just a fabrication of Motiram's mind.

Bir Charitra by Girish Ballabh Joshi is considered to be the first Nepali novel written. It was published in 1903. However, the publication of the novel was restricted by the Rana regime and the complete edition of the novel was published in 1965. The manuscript of the novel was shared among the readers. Roopmati by Rudra Raj Pande, published in 1934, became the first most popular novel in Nepali language. Since, the complete edition of Bir Chaitra was published much later, Roopmati could also be considered the first novel in Nepali language.

1960–1991

The Pre-Revolution Era was a very prolific period for creative writing despite the lack of freedom of expression. During this period the independent magazine "Sharada" was the only printed medium available for the publication of Nepali literature. Short stories by Laxmi Prasad Devkota, Guru Prasad Mainali, Bishweshwar Prasad Koirala and Gadul Singh Lama (Sanu Lama) have been recognized as being of tremendous significance, and this was arguably the most significant period for the development of Nepali literature.

Plays like the influential Muna Madan by Laxmi Prasad Devkota tell the tales of human lives: the story is about a man who leaves his wife, mother, and home to earn money in Tibet, precipitating tragedy. Other stories by Bishweshwar Prasad Koirala introduced psychology into literature, for instance through creations such as Teen Ghumti, Doshi Chashma and Narendra Dai.
This period produced several prominent poets such as Laxmi Prasad Devkota, Gopal Prasad Rimal, Siddhicharan Shrestha, Bhim Nidhi Tiwari and Balkrishna Sama. Later, several poets come into light during the Panchayat regime. Indra Bahadur Rai, Parijat, Bhupi Sherchan, Madhav Prasad Ghimire, Bairagi Kainla, Banira Giri, Ishwor Ballav, Tulsi Diwasa, Kul Bahadur KC, Toya Gurung, Vishnu Raj Atreya and Krishna Bhooshan Bal can be named in this regard.

Post-revolution era
Nepali language authors contributing after the democratic revolution of 1991 to present day could be listed as Khagendra Sangraula, Ashesh Malla, Yuyutsu Sharma, Suman Pokhrel, Shrawan Mukarung, Geeta Tripathee, Nayan Raj Pandey, Ramesh Kshitij, Narayan Wagle, Buddhi Sagar, Mahananda Poudyal, Deenbandhu Sharma, Subhash Chandra Bhandari among many more.

Nepali-language speakers are rapidly migrating around the globe and many books of Nepali language literature are published from different corners of the world. Diasporic literature has developed new ways of thinking and created a new branch in Nepali language literature.

See also 
 List of Nepali language poets
 List of Nepali-language authors
 List of Nepali poets
 List of Nepali writers
 Bhutanese Nepali literature
 List of Nepali literature in English, the translated literatures

References

Further reading
K. Pradhan: A History of Nepali Literature, New Delhi: Sahitya Akad., 1984
Gorkhas Imagined: Indra Bahadur Rai in Translation, edited by Prem Poddar and Anmole Prasad, Mukti Prakashan, Kalimpong, 2009.
Himalayan Voices: An Introduction to Modern Nepali Literature (Voices from Asia) [Anthology], edited and translated by Michael J. Hutt, Univ of California Press, 1991. 
Stewart: Secret Places (Manoa 13:2): Featuring New Writing from Nepal, ed. by Frank Stewart, Samrat Upadhyay, Manjushree Thapa, University of Hawaii Press, illustrated edition 2001
Nepalese literature, ed. by Madhav Lal Karmacharya, Kathmandu : Royal Nepal Academy 2005
Roaring Recitals:Five Nepali Poets, Translated into Nepali by Yuyutsu RD Sharma, Published by Nirala Publications, New Delhi, 1999*
Pratik: A Magazine of Contemporary Writing, Edited by Yuyutsu RD Sharma, Kathmandu

External links
The largest online magazine for Nepali Literature Online Sahitya
A Bangla Article on Nepali Literature
Nepali poetry

Literature, Nepali
Nepali language
Nepalese literature
Literature by language
History of literature in Nepal
Indian literature by language
Nepalese literature by language